William Donnelly or Willie Donnelly may refer to:
William Earnest Donnelly, New Zealand schoolteacher
William J. S. Donnelly (1844–1914), Newfoundland politician
William M. Donnelly (1885–1946), American politician in Michigan
William Donnelly (1845–1897), member of the Black Donnellys
Willie Donnelly (footballer) (1872–1934), Irish footballer
Willie Donnelly (hurler), Irish hurler

Fictional
Will Donnelly, character on television series Love Is a Many Splendored Thing